Milan Luthria is an Indian film director who works in Hindi films. He is best known as the director of Ajay Devgan Once Upon a Time in Mumbaai (2010). He is the nephew of producer and director Mahesh Bhatt.

Personal life
Milan is the son of Raj Khosla.

Career
Starting his career as an assistant director to Dharmesh Darshan for Lootere in 1993, Luthria made his directorial debut in 1999 with the successful action thriller film Kachche Dhaage. The film, released under the Tips Films banner, starred Ajay Devgan as a smuggler on the Rajasthan-Kashmir, Pakistan border and Saif Ali Khan, on the run from the Border Security Force, the Central Bureau of Investigation, and the border mafia. Luthria shot the film in Rajasthan and Switzerland. The film received a mixed reception. Although the photography of the film was praised with the scenic backdrop of the Rajasthani desert and the green valleys and snow-capped peaks of Switzerland, it was seen as a weaker film than that of Soldier, a film with similar theme which had been released the year before.

In 2002, Luthria once again worked with Devgan when he directed Chori Chori, also starring Rani Mukerji and Sonali Bendre. The film was initially scheduled for release in 2002 but during the filming the producer died and its release was delayed, eventually being released on 1 August 2003. The film received a mixed reception. Taran Adarsh, although remarking that Luthria "handled a few sequences with flourish", believed that despite an interesting storyline, the script was fundamentally flawed, "hackneyed" as he put it, believing that interest in it fizzled out by the second half of the film, becoming "sluggish" with its progression. However, Sukanya Verma described the film as "heartwarming", remarking that "like most feel good romances, Chori Chori is about letting the heart rule the head."

In 2004, Luthria directed the war drama Deewaar. The film, starring Bollywood veterans Amitabh Bachchan, Akshaye Khanna and Sanjay Dutt, is set during the Indo-Pakistani War of 1971. It features Bachchan, a major who is captured by the Pakistani army, along with over 30 soldiers during the war and only freed 33 years later by his son, who he has not seen since he was a child, on a rescue mission. The film was generally panned by the critics although it was a commercial success, going straight to number 1 in the Indian film charts in the week of release. Film4 wrote of the film, "A Bollywood thriller with plenty of explosive action, yet which fails to come to life. Plotting is familiar, characters bland and a predictable storyline fails to excite or engage."

in February 2006, Luthria released Taxi Number 9211. Working with producer Ramesh Sippy, with a soundtrack composed by the new age music composing duo, Vishal Dadlani and Shekhar Ravjiani, Luthria shot the film in 2005. The film, a comedy thriller, featured John Abraham and Nana Patekar (as the taxi driver) involved in a cat and mouse game during a two-hour taxi trip, with financial implications. The film was a major commercial and critical success, becoming the 16th highest-grossing film in India in 2006. Film critics were impressed with the originality of the script and the unpredictability and innovative devices used in the script, as the men progressed through the metropolis.

In 2007, Luthria directed the cricket comedy Hattrick, featuring Paresh Rawal, Rimi Sen, Kunal Kapoor, Nana Patekar and Danny Denzongpa. In 2010 he directed Once Upon a Time in Mumbaai. The film again starred Ajay Devgan, but this time he played a character called Sultan Mirza who is Messiah of the poor, fear of the rich and authority of the powerful, the one whom people turned to when there was nowhere else to look. The silent ruler of the streets of Bombay, he did everything that was wrong according to the law, but right according to him – i.e. the "Indian version of Robin Hood". The film was produced by Balaji Telefilms and Popcorn Entertainment and was released on 30 July 2010. According to Luthria, "My film for Ekta will take a penetrating look at gangsterism in the 1980s. I'm quite enamoured by the period, quite taken up by the period and its flamboyance. There was a lot of action and inner life in some of the films during that period. I think the last film that looked at gangsterism from inside was Anurag Basu's Gangster: A Love Story".

In 2011, Milan directed the movie The Dirty Picture starring Vidya Balan, Naseeruddin Shah, Tusshar Kapoor and Emraan Hashmi. The film is based on the real-life story of the late Southern siren Silk Smitha, who Milan says he even briefly interacted with during her time in the 80s and 90s. Upon release, the film received both critical and commercial success.

In 2017 the film Baadshaho was released, becoming the fourth collaboration with Ajay Devgn, and starring Devgn, Ileana D'Cruz, Vidyurt Jammwal, Emraan Hashmi and Esha Gupta.

Filmography

Awards

References

External links

 

21st-century Indian film directors
Living people
Hindi-language film directors
Film directors from Mumbai
1962 births
Screen Awards winners